Câmpulung Coal Mine is an open-pit mining exploitation, one of the largest in Romania. It is located in Câmpulung, Argeș County, with estimated coal reserves of 16.5 million tonnes. The legal entity managing the Câmpulung mine is the Ploiești National Coal Company, which was set up in 1957.

References

Coal mines in Romania
Câmpulung
1846 establishments in Wallachia